Jamie M. Dagg is a Canadian film director and writer, who won the 2016 Academy of Canadian Cinema and Television's Canadian Screen Award for Best First Feature, presented to the year's best feature film directed by a first-time director, for his film River.

Early life 
Originally from Timmins, Ontario, Dagg travelled in Southeast Asia for several years beginning at age 18 before moving to Toronto to work in film.

Career 
His first short film, Waiting, was released in 2005, and his second, Sunday, was released in 2008. He has also directed music videos for Broken Social Scene, Bedouin Soundclash and Black Rebel Motorcycle Club.

His second feature film, Sweet Virginia, was released in 2017. Dagg received a nomination for the Directors Guild of Canada's DGC Discovery Award.

References

External links

Canadian music video directors
Best First Feature Genie and Canadian Screen Award winners
Film directors from Toronto
Writers from Timmins
Writers from Toronto
Living people
21st-century Canadian screenwriters
21st-century Canadian male writers
Canadian male screenwriters
Year of birth missing (living people)